Emme Marcy Rylan (born Marcy Faith Behrens; November 4, 1980) is an American actress. From 2005 until 2013, she was credited as Marcy Rylan. She is best known for her portrayals on the CBS soap operas Guiding Light as Lizzie Spaulding and The Young and the Restless as Abby Newman. From 2013 to 2020, she portrayed the role of Lulu Spencer on ABC's General Hospital.

Career
Rylan joined the cast of Guiding Light as Lizzie Spaulding on February 7, 2006, taking over the role from Crystal Hunt, until the finale on September 18, 2009. She won the role of Winnie Harper in the straight-to-video 2006 cheerleading film Bring It On: All or Nothing in which she co-starred with fellow Guiding Light alumnus Hayden Panettiere. She was a guest star on the Nickelodeon show Drake & Josh and appeared in several national network commercials.

After CBS announced the cancellation of Guiding Light, Rylan joined The Young and the Restless as Abby Newman. Her first airdate was May 18, 2010. She was later absent from the soap during the 2011 holiday season due a maternity leave. In September 2012, it was announced that Rylan had been let go from The Young and the Restless due to budgetary cuts.

She made her final appearance on October 23, 2012; she later returned to the role from February 11, 2013, to April 10, 2013, when she ultimately left the role; she was recast with actress Melissa Ordway. On March 6, 2013, it was announced that Rylan would join the cast of General Hospital as Lulu Spencer, replacing Julie Marie Berman. On December 1, 2020, after increased speculation, Rylan exited the role.

Personal life
Rylan graduated from Tyrone Area High School in Tyrone, Pennsylvania in 1999. She and her long term significant other Don Money have three children — two sons and a daughter.

Filmography

Film

Television

References

External links

1980 births
Living people
American film actresses
American soap opera actresses
Actresses from North Carolina
Actresses from Pennsylvania
People from Blair County, Pennsylvania
People from Providence Township, Rowan County, North Carolina
21st-century American actresses